Lalmonirhat Airport  is located near Lalmonirhat, at the north side border of Bangladesh. Now the airport given to Bangladesh Aerospace and Aviation University to make it Permanent campus.

Airlines and destination
Currently there are no scheduled flights operated by any airlines.

External links
 Civil Aviation Authority of Bangladesh: Airports

Airports in Bangladesh